The Belfius Art Collection is a collection of Belgian art owned by the Belfius Bank (and thus as of August 2018 by the Belgian State, owner of Belfius since 2011).

History
The current collection of Belfius Bank is the combination of the collections of three older banks, which are now part of Belfius. Paribas Belgium collected art from the 16th to the 18th century, plus some contemporary (post-WWII) art. The Gemeentekrediet collected Belgian art from 1860 to 1945. BACOB did not start collecting art until 1980, and focused on contemporary Belgian art. Belfius continued collecting art after the fusion of the banks, and the complete collection has grown to more than 4,300 works. 

This makes it the largest company-based Belgian art collection, while being considered one of the 100 most important worldwide. The Belgian state took over the bank in 2011, so effectively owns the art collection as well.

Small selections of the collection are open to the public two Saturdays every month. The bank lends works to exhibitions as well.

Future
The plans, as of August 2018, to denationalize Belfius partially or completely by going to a stock exchange with it, have raised concerns about the future of the collection, with calls to separate the art collection from the bank and keep it completely in the hands of the government.

Collection

The collection is mainly focused on painting and some sculptures, but also contains tapestries, books, and furniture. The below list is based on the works described on the Belfius Art Collection website, and artists and artworks mentioned in other sources.

Philip Aguirre y Otegui, Man standing before a wall
Pierre Alechinsky
Albert Bartsoen, Steenbakkerij in Heusden
Bram Bogart
Michaël Borremans, Miranda
Marcel Broodthaers, Le sous-sol
Jan Brueghel the Elder together with Hendrick Van Balen, Offergave aan Ceres met guirlande van vruchten
Jean Brusselmans, Landschap met koeien
Anto Carte, Madone
Jacques Charlier, Peinture cruelle
Emile Claus; De overstroming en De communicanten
Stijn Cole, L'Extase > 18/9/2017 - 12:55
Alexandra Cool
Leo Copers
Jules De Bruycker
Berlinde De Bruyckere
Antoon De Clerck, Roger en Zulma op bezoek
Thierry De Cordier, Inscripta Christo pagina
Anne-Pierre de Kat, De lichtekooi
Raoul De Keyser
Gery De Smet, Euskal dantzak
Gustave De Smet, Zitten naakt en Spelende kinderen
Léon De Smet, De paardenmolen, In de tuin en Portret van een vrouw
Jules De Sutter, Moeder
Charles Degroux
Luc Deleu, De onaangepaste stad – La ville inadaptée
Ronny Delrue, Maandag, 09.12.2002
Paul Delvaux, De stad bij dageraad and Het congres
Wim Delvoye, Angélique
Denmark, Oratorio del silencio
Robert Devriendt, Coyote
Sam Dillemans, Sam-Lizy
Christian Dotremont, Logogram: Hendes haar…
Jan Dries, Mummie van het heden
James Ensor, De dronkaards, De bevrijding van Andromeda and Les bains d'Ostende
Henri Evenepoel
Jan Fabre, Mur de la montée des Anges
Emile Fabry, De tuin der dromen
Jan Fyt, Stilleven met jachtgerei, gevogelte en vruchtenkorf
Georges Grard, De grote Afrikaanse
Philip Huyghe, Jacqueline en Joly
Ann Veronica Janssens, RAL3002
Floris Jespers, De cocotte
Jacob Jordaens, Marsyas door Apollo gevild
Fernand Khnopff, Portret van Gabriëlle Braun
Marie-Jo Lafontaine, V.I.N.C.E.N.T.
Thomas Lerooy, Nest
Lili Dujourie, Tussen altijd en nooit
René Magritte
Hubert Malfait, Boerin, koe en paard and À la fenêtre
Auguste Mambour, Tête de nègresse
Pol Mara
Marcel Marien
Frans Masereel, De stad and La montée au calvaire
Xavier Mellery, De dans, De afschaffing der tolgelden
Herri met de Bles
Jan Matsys
Constantin Meunier, Kolenraapster
Henri Michaux, Sans titre dit Grande bataille
George Minne, Kind met de waterzak and Treurende moeder met twee kinderen
Antoine Mortier
Hans Op De Beeck, Small Pond (2/3)
Willem Paerels, Portret van Georges Giroux
Luc Peire, Marcinelle
Constant Permeke, Hoofd, De verloofden, De dageraad, Staand naakt and Knielende figuur
Pieter Pourbus
Arne Quinze
Roger Raveel, Neerhof II
Félicien Rops
Peter Paul Rubens, De roof van de Sabijnse maagden and De verzoening tussen Romeinen en Sabijnen, 2 sketches from 1640 (allegedly the last sketches he finished before his death)
Meggy Rustamova, Waiting for the secret
Jacob Savery, De bekering van Paulus
Roelandt Savery, (De scheiding van de kudden van Jakob en Laba
Edgar Scauflaire, Naakt met halsketting
Daniel Seghers, Bloemstuk met Maria en Kind en de jonge Johannes de Doper
Michel Seuphor, La férule
Léon Spilliaert, Zeilschip in volle zee, Winterlandschap, Huis op de dijk and Golfbreker met paal
Piet Stockmans
Luc Tuymans, The rape and The door
Edgard Tytgat, Hommage à Mozart "Mozart et les Bohémiens"
Raoul Ubac, Calvarie
Rinus Van de Velde, I’ve been in a similar position before : attacked by a personified outside…*
Gustave Van de Woestyne, Portret van Joseph de Craene
Frits Van den Berghe, De verrukking, Le repenti, Winter in Blaricum, De ballingen and De schilder
Koen van den Broek
Anthony van Dyck
Roger Van Gindertael, Les trois jongleurs
Daniel van Heil
Jan Van Imschoot, Reconstructie van een terechtstelling, de keizer rust and Ja, ja für Elise
Anne-Mie van Kerckhoven, Maeterlinck
Théo van Rysselberghe, Het rode zeil
Dan Van Severen, Triptiek
Hilde Van Sumere, Swingende dialoog
Hans Vandekerckhove, The well
Koen Vanmechelen, Mechelse Redcap + King and Queen + Androgyne
Geo Verbanck, Brunehilde
Jan Vercruysse, Les paroles XIII
Jacques Verduyn, Zittend figuur
Pieter Vermeersch, Untitled (Inverse 1)
Liliane Vertessen, Ant-Ik 1986 87/75
David Vinckboons, Landschap met boeren die terugkeren van het dorpsfeest
Marthe Wéry
Rik Wouters, Het zotte geweld, Nel aan de was, Vrouw voor een rode gordijn, Portret van Ernest Wijnants and Borstbeeld van James Ensor
Maurice Wyckaert, Groot landschap

Gallery

References

External links 

 Official Website [in Dutch]

 

Art collections in Belgium
Private art collections